Rogojny  is a village in the administrative district of Gmina Świętajno, within Olecko County, Warmian-Masurian Voivodeship, in northern Poland.

Notable residents
Bruno Walden (1911-1946), officer

References

Rogojny